Ahsen Eroğlu (born 27 October 1994) is a Turkish actress.

Life and career 
Eroğlu was born on 27 October 1994 in Çorlu. Her family is of Turkish descent who immigrated from Bulgaria. She finished her education at Ege University School of Physical Education. She later received acting lessons at Sahne 3MOTA.

She started her acting career in 2015 with her role in the Modern Habil Kabil TV series as Zehra. She then portrayed Meleki Hatun in the historical drama Muhteşem Yüzyıl: Kösem, before being cast in recurring roles in Anne, Kızlarım İçin, and İstanbullu Gelin.

In 2019, she had her first leading role in the TV series Kuzgun, in which she played the role of Kumru Cebeci. In 2020, Eroğlu appeared in a leading role in the series Menajerimi Ara, an adaptation of the French TV series Dix pour cent. In 2020, she portrayed the character of Gizem in the movie Geranium (Sardunya). She is also in the lead role in the theater play The Girl in the Tree, adapted from Şebnem İşigüzel's novel of the same name.

Filmography

Awards and nominations

References

External links 
 
 

1994 births
Living people
Turkish television actresses
Ege University alumni
People from Çorlu